Rao Bahadur Kashinath Narayan Dikshit (21 October 1889 – 12 August 1946) was an Indian archaeologist who served as Director-general of the Archaeological Survey of India (ASI) from 1937 to 1944.

Early life and education 

Dikshit was born on 21 October 1889 in a Karhade Brahmin family of Pandharpur in the then Bombay Presidency (now Maharashtra, India).

Career 

Dikshit worked as Superintendent of Archaeology in the Indian Museum before joining the Archaeological Survey. In the ASI, he served as Government Epigraphist and as Deputy Director-General. He was a part of John Marshall's team which excavated Mohenjodaro. In 1937, Dikshit was appointed Director General of the ASI.

Dikshit assumed office on 21 March 1937 and continued till 1944. As Director General, Dikshit gave license to the University of Calcutta to excavate the site of Bangarh in South Dinajpur. Between 1940-44,. the ASI conducted large-scale excavations at Ahicchatra near Bareilly. Dikshit retired in 1944 and was succeeded by Sir Mortimer Wheeler.

References 

 

1889 births
1944 deaths
20th-century Indian archaeologists
Directors General of the Archaeological Survey of India
People from Solapur district
Scientists from Maharashtra
Indian institute directors